August 12 - Eastern Orthodox liturgical calendar - August 14

All fixed commemorations below are observed on August 26 by Eastern Orthodox Churches on the Old Calendar.

For August 13, Orthodox Churches on the Old Calendar commemorate the Saints listed on July 31.

Feasts

 Apodosis of the Transfiguration of Our Lord, God, and Savior Jesus Christ.

Saints

 Martyr Hippolytus of Rome, and 18 martyrs with him (258), including:  (see also January 30 - Hippolytus of Rome, Bishop of Rome - who may or may not be the same individual)
 Martyrs Concordia, Irenaeus and Abundius.
 Martyr Coronatus, by the sword.
 Saint Eudocia the Empress (460), wife of Theodosius the Younger, in Palestine.
 Venerable Seridus, Abbot, of Gaza (ca. 543)
 Venerable Abba Dorotheus of Gaza (560-580)
 Venerable Dositheos, attendant to Abba Dorotheus of Gaza (6th century)

Pre-Schism Western saints

 Saint Pontian, Pope of Rome, was exiled by Emperor Maximinus Thrax to Sardinia in c 235, where he died from ill-treatment (235)
 Saint Cassian of Imola, a martyr who refused to worship idols and suffered a slow death in Imola in Italy (c. 250)
 Saints Centolla and Helen, two virgin-martyrs near Burgos in Spain (c. 304)
 Saint Cassian of Todi, Bishop of Todi, martyred under Maximian Herculeus (4th century)
 Saint Junian of Mairé, founder of the monastery of Mairé in Poitou in France and later a hermit in Chaulnay (587)
 Saint Radegunde of Poitiers, nun (587)
 Saint Muredach (Murtagh, Muiredach), first Bishop of Killala and founder of Innismurray (6th century)  (see also August 12)
 Saint Wigbert, Abbot of Hersfeld, and English missionary to Germany, Confessor (c. 747)
 Saint Herulph, a monk at St Gall in Switzerland, then founded the monastery of Ellwangen (764) near Augsberg in Germany, later became Bishop of Langres in France (785)
 Saint Ludolf, Abbot of New Corvey (Nova Corbeia) in Westphalia in Germany from 971 to 983 (983)

Post-Schism Orthodox saints

 Empress Irene (tonsured Xenia), wife of Emperor John II Comnenus (1134)
 Saint Tikhon of Zadonsk, Bishop of Voronezh, Wonderworker of Zadonsk (1783)

New martyrs and confessors

 New Hieromartyrs John Shyshev, Ioasph Panov and Constantine Popov, Priests (1918)
 New Hieromartyr Benjamin of Petrograd, Metropolitan, and those with him (1921)
 New Hieromartyrs Sergius, Archimandrite, and those with him (1921)
 New Hieromartyr Seraphim (Zvezdinsky), Bishop of Dmitrov (1937)
 New Hieromartyrs Nicholas Orlov and Jacob Arkhippov, Priests, and Alexis Vedensky, Deacon, of Yarsoslavl-Rostov (1937)
 New Martyr Basil Aleksandrin (1942)

Other commemorations

 Translation of the relics (c. 681) of Venerable Maximus the Confessor (662)
 Uncovering of the relics (1547) of St. Maximus of Moscow, Fool-for-Christ (1433)
 Icons of the Most Holy Theotokos:
 "Of Minsk" (1500)
 "Of the Passion" (1641)
 "Of the Seven Arrows" (Vologda) / "The Softener of Evil Hearts" (1830)
 Repose of Valaam Schema-monk Timothy of Mt. Athos (1848)

Icon gallery

Notes

References

Sources
 August 13 / August 26. Orthodox Calendar (PRAVOSLAVIE.RU).
 August 26 / August 13. HOLY TRINITY RUSSIAN ORTHODOX CHURCH (A parish of the Patriarchate of Moscow).
 August 13. OCA - The Lives of the Saints.
 The Autonomous Orthodox Metropolia of Western Europe and the Americas (ROCOR). St. Hilarion Calendar of Saints for the year of our Lord 2004. St. Hilarion Press (Austin, TX). p. 59.
 Menologion: The Thirteenth Day of the Month of August. Orthodoxy in China.
 August 13. Latin Saints of the Orthodox Patriarchate of Rome.
 The Roman Martyrology. Transl. by the Archbishop of Baltimore. Last Edition, According to the Copy Printed at Rome in 1914. Revised Edition, with the Imprimatur of His Eminence Cardinal Gibbons. Baltimore: John Murphy Company, 1916. pp. 242-243.
 Rev. Richard Stanton. A Menology of England and Wales, or, Brief Memorials of the Ancient British and English Saints Arranged According to the Calendar, Together with the Martyrs of the 16th and 17th Centuries. London: Burns & Oates, 1892. pp. 391-393.

 Greek Sources
 Great Synaxaristes:  13 ΑΥΓΟΥΣΤΟΥ. ΜΕΓΑΣ ΣΥΝΑΞΑΡΙΣΤΗΣ.
  Συναξαριστής. 13 Αυγούστου. ECCLESIA.GR. (H ΕΚΚΛΗΣΙΑ ΤΗΣ ΕΛΛΑΔΟΣ).

 Russian Sources
  26 августа (13 августа). Православная Энциклопедия под редакцией Патриарха Московского и всея Руси Кирилла (электронная версия). (Orthodox Encyclopedia - Pravenc.ru).

August in the Eastern Orthodox calendar